The 1972 Arizona State Sun Devils football team represented Arizona State University in the 1972 NCAA University Division football season.

Schedule

Depth chart

Captains: Larry Delbridge, Steve Matlock

Offense

Defense

Coaching staff

Head coach: Frank Kush

Assistants: Don Baker (offensive backfield), Larry Kentera (DE/LB), Jerry Thompson (DL), Al Luginbill (DB), Joe McDonald (WR), Al Tanara (OL), Bill Kajikawa (freshman)

Game summaries

Houston

Rankings

1972 team players in the NFL
The following players were claimed in the 1973 NFL Draft.

References

Arizona State
Arizona State Sun Devils football seasons
Western Athletic Conference football champion seasons
Fiesta Bowl champion seasons
Arizona State Sun Devils football